Nicolas Bay (born 21 December 1977) is a French politician and Member of the European Parliament (MEP) from France. He served as General Secretary of the National Front from 2014 to 2017. He has served as a Regional Councillor for Normandy since January 2016, having previously served as a Municipal Councillor for Elbeuf from 2014 to 2015.

Life and career
Bay was born in Saint-Germain-en-Laye, Yvelines. He joined the National Front at 15, in 1992. He soon became the leader of the National Front's youth wing (FNJ) in the Yvelines and Ile-de-France region.

In 1998, along with Guillaume Peltier, he founded the Youth Christian Action Association (AJAC), a movement which opposed the PACS and euthanasia. It claimed around 250 members and was close to the National Republican Movement (MNR), led by Bruno Mégret.

In 1998, during the FN split, he joined Bruno Mégret's National Republican Movement, first as deputy national director of the National Movement of Youth (youth branch of the MNR) and later as responsible for elections within the party. He was one of the two MNR municipal councillors elected in Sartrouville (Yvelines) in the 2001 French municipal elections when his list won 11.3% of the votes. He was candidate in the Yvelines' 5th constituency in the 2002 elections. In the 2004 regional election he was the MNR's top candidate in Île-de-France, winning 1.18% of the vote. As the MNR's top candidate in the Île-de-France European constituency in the 2004 European election, he won only 0.28% of the vote. He retained his seat in the Sartrouville municipal council in the 2008 local elections, but his list won only 5.2% of the vote. As a result, he is the MNR's only local councillor in French municipalities with more than 3,000 inhabitants.

Upon Mégret's resignation from the leadership of the MNR in May 2008, Bay and his allies won leadership of the party. However, due to his increasing contacts with the FN and Marine Le Pen in particular, the party council decided to remove him from the party in September 2008. Although he is not a member of the FN, instead head of a political club ('National Convergences'), he was on the FN's list (led by Marine Le Pen) in the North-West constituency in the 2009 European election.

Despite protests from within the party, he was selected to be National Front's candidate in Upper Normandy for the 2010 regional elections.

As a member of the eurosceptic National Rally, he firmly defended the United Kingdom's Brexit decision.

Personal life
He was a boy scout in the Scouts Unitaires de France.

He is a self-declared Roman Catholic, and he participated in the protests against same-sex marriage law in 2013.

He married in 2008 and has 3 children.

Suspension from National Rally
On 15 February 2022, French media reported that Bay had been suspended from the National Rally due to his alleged support of Le Pen's challenger Éric Zemmour. He considered these accusations unfounded. The next day, he filed a complaint and lawsuit against the RN for defamation.

On 16 February 2022, he announced his support for candidate Éric Zemmour for the presidential election and join Reconquête where he was named Vice-President.

Assumed offices

March 2001: First candidature, as list's head, in municipal elections in Sartrouville, Yvelines (11.3%), first election as Municipal Counsellor. Re-elected in March 2008
 21 March 2010: Elected Regional Counsellor in Upper Normandy (14.3%), President of FN's group in the Council
 23 March 2014: Elected Municipal Counsellor in Elbeuf and Communal Counsellor CREA (Community of the agglomeration Rouen Elbeuf Austreberthe). Respecting the new law about not cumulating offices, Nicolas Bay dropped his municipal Counsellor office in Elbeuf the 16 March 2015
 25 May 2014: Elected French deputy in the European Parliament (running on Marine Le Pen's North-West France list, 33,62%). Member of the ITRE commission. Member of interparliamentary ACP-EU delegation and substitute member of relation with Israel delegation
 December 2015: Leads FN's list in Normandy for the regional elections, winning 27.50% of the vote in the second round (three ways election). President of FN's group in the regional Council of Normandy

Political functions

1997-1998: Departmental Secretary for the Front National's youth wing (FNJ) in the Yvelines
 2005-2008: General Secretary of the National Republican Movement (MNR)
 2008: Creation of Convergences nationales (CN) and support to Jean-Marie Le Pen's presidential candidature
 Since 20 January 2011: Member of National Rally's political bureau
 10 January 2012 - 22 April 2012: Spokesman of Marine Le Pen's presidential campaign
 8 December 2012: named Assistant General Secretary of the National Front, in charge of regional federations
 March 2013: Director of 2014 National Front's campaign for municipal elections
 Since 30 November 2014: Named General Secretary of National Front by Marine Le Pen in FN's Lyon Congress
 March 2015: Director of Front National's campaign for departmental elections
 February 2022: Vice-President of Reconquete

References

1977 births
Living people
Paris Nanterre University alumni
MEPs for North-West France 2014–2019
MEPs for France 2019–2024
National Rally (France) MEPs
People from Saint-Germain-en-Laye
National Rally (France) politicians
Politicians from Normandy
People from Sartrouville
Reconquête politicians